The 2013-14 season, is the 28º Primera B Metropolitana season since it became part of the third tier of the Argentine football league system, and its 79º season overall. The tournament is reserved for teams directly affiliated to the Asociación del Fútbol Argentino (AFA), while teams affiliated to AFA through local leagues (known as "indirectly affiliated to AFA") have to play the Torneo Argentino A, which is the other third tier competition.

The regular season began on August 2, 2013 and is scheduled to end on May 31, 2014. Post-season matches are scheduled to start on June 4 and end on June 14. 21 teams will take part of the competition with seventeen of them remaining from the 2012–13 season. They'll be joined by two teams relegated from the 2012-13 Primera B Nacional and two teams promoted from the 2012-13 Primera C.

Competition format

The tournament is composed of 21 teams playing on a double round-robin format, each team then playing a total of 40 matches. Three points are awarded for a win, one for a draw and none for a loss. The team with more points is declared champion and will be promoted to the Primera B Nacional. Teams positioned 2nd to 5th qualify for the Torneo Reducido, which will be played on a, home and away, knock-out system, the pairings will be 2º vs 5º and 3º vs 4º for the semifinals, with the winners advancing to the final, the winner of the final is then promoted to the Primera B Nacional. If the playoff ends in a draw, there is a penalty shoot-out to determine a winner.

Relegation is not dependent on the standings table, rather, a points average system is used, creating a separate parallel standings table considering the performances of the teams through the latest 3 seasons (2011–12, 2012–13, 2013–14). The total of points is divided by the total of matches played on the division to get the average of points per match for each team. The two teams with the worst points average are relegated to the Primera C.

Teams

17 teams remain from the previous season. Nueva Chicago and Deportivo Merlo were relegated from the Primera B Nacional and replace the promoted Villa San Carlos and Brown (Adrogué). UAI Urquiza and Fénix are joining too after winning promotion from the Primera C and replacing the relegated Central Córdoba and San Telmo.

Standings

Results

Relegation

Torneo Reducido

External links
List of Argentine second division champions by RSSSF

3
Primera B Metropolitana seasons